Greta Mikalauskytė  (born 1993) is a Lithuanian beauty queen and model, elected as Miss Universe Lithuania 2012 and was represented her country in the 2012 Miss Universe pageants.

Miss Lithuania 2012 & Miss Universe 2012
Greta Mikalauskyte has been selected as Miss Universe Lithuania 2012. Greta has also won the First Runner-up Miss Lithuania 2012 title at the grand finale of the 21st edition of Miss Lithuania beauty pageant which was held at the Švyturys Arena, Klaipėda. Greta  represented Lithuania in the 61st edition of Miss Universe 2012 beauty pageant.

References

External links
Official Miss Lithuania website

Living people
Miss Universe 2012 contestants
Lithuanian beauty pageant winners
1993 births